The name Victor or Viktor may refer to:

 Victor (name), including a list of people with the given name, mononym, or surname

Arts and entertainment

Film
 Victor (1951 film), a French drama film 
 Victor (1993 film), a French short film
 Victor (2008 film), a 2008 TV film about Canadian swimmer Victor Davis
 Victor (2009 film), a French comedy
 Victor, a 2017 film about Victor Torres by Brandon Dickerson
 Viktor (film), a 2014 Franco/Russian film

Music
 Victor (album), a 1996 album by Alex Lifeson
 "Victor", a song from the 1979 album Eat to the Beat by Blondie

Businesses 
 Victor Talking Machine Company, early 20th century American recording company, forerunner of RCA Records
 Victor Company of Japan, usually known as JVC, a Japanese electronics corporation originally  a subsidiary of the Victor Talking Machine Company
 Victor Entertainment, or JVCKenwood Victor Entertainment, a Japanese record label
 Victor Interactive Software, a Japanese video game software publisher and developer
 Victor Technology, known earlier as Victor Adding Machine Co. and Victor Comptometer, an American calculator company
 Victor (sports company), a Taiwanese manufacturer of sporting equipment
 Victor (mouse trap company)

Military 
 Victor-class submarine, NATO designation of a class of Soviet submarines
 Handley Page Victor, a Cold War era British strategic bomber aircraft
 Victor, the letter "V" in the NATO phonetic alphabet

Places in the United States
 Victor, Arkansas
 Victor, California
 Victor, Colorado
 Victor, Idaho
 Victor, Indiana
 Victor, Iowa
 Victor, Kansas
 Victor, Montana
 Victor, New York
 Victor (village), New York
 Victor, South Dakota
 Victor, Utah
 Victor, Fayette County, West Virginia
 Victor, Kanawha County, West Virginia
 Victor Township (disambiguation)

Other uses
 Victor (champion), the winner in a challenge, contest or competition
 Victor (symbol), an emblem in some Spanish and Latin American universities
 Victor, formerly Empire Ben, a ship
 Victor, Wanswerd, a Dutch windmill
 Tropical Storm Victor. various storms named Victor
 TVS Victor, a motorcycle by TVS Motor Company
 Victor 3900, an old computor

See also 

 Saint-Victor (disambiguation), various places in France
 The Victor (disambiguation)
 Victor Harbor (disambiguation)
 Victoria (disambiguation)
 Viktoria (disambiguation)
 Viktorija (disambiguation)
 Victorinus (disambiguation)
 Victory (disambiguation)
 Vicky
 Viktors
 Wiktor (name)
 Pobednik ('The Victor'), a monument in Belgrade 
 Victa, Victa mowers
 Vektor SS-77, a type of gun